Gogar railway station served the area of Gogar, Edinburgh, Scotland from 1842 to 1930 on the Edinburgh and Glasgow Railway.

History 
The station opened in July 1842 by the Edinburgh and Glasgow Railway. To the east was the goods station. The passenger station closed on 22 September 1930.

References

External links 

Disused railway stations in Edinburgh
Railway stations in Great Britain opened in 1842
Railway stations in Great Britain closed in 1930
1842 establishments in Scotland
1930 disestablishments in Scotland
Former North British Railway stations